In 1924, the Virginia General Assembly enacted the Racial Integrity Act. The act reinforced racial segregation by prohibiting interracial marriage and classifying as "white" a person "who has no trace whatsoever of any blood other than Caucasian." The act, an outgrowth of eugenist and scientific racist propaganda, was pushed by Walter Plecker, a white supremacist and eugenist who held the post of registrar of Virginia Bureau of Vital Statistics.

The Racial Integrity Act required that all birth certificates and marriage certificates in Virginia to include the person's race as either "white" or "colored." The Act classified all non-whites, including Native Americans, as "colored." The act was part of a series of "racial integrity laws" enacted in Virginia to reinforce racial hierarchies and prohibit the mixing of races; other statutes included the Public Assemblages Act of 1926 (which required the racial segregation of all public meeting areas) and a 1930 act that defined any person with even a trace of African ancestry as black (thus codifying the so-called "one-drop rule").

In 1967, both the Racial Integrity Act and the Virginia Sterilization Act of 1924 were officially overturned by the United States Supreme Court in their ruling Loving v. Virginia. In 2001, the Virginia General Assembly passed a resolution that condemned the Racial Integrity Act for its "use as a respectable, 'scientific' veneer to cover the activities of those who held blatantly racist views."

History leading to the laws' passage: 1859–1924 
In the 1920s, Virginia's registrar of statistics, Dr. Walter Ashby Plecker, was allied with the newly founded Anglo-Saxon Clubs of America in persuading the Virginia General Assembly to pass the Racial Integrity Law of 1924.  The club was founded in Virginia by John Powell of Richmond in the fall of 1922; within a year the club for white males had more than 400 members and 31 posts in the state.

In 1923, the Anglo-Saxon Club founded two posts in Charlottesville, one for the town and one for students at the University of Virginia. A major goal was to end "amalgamation" by racial intermarriage.  Members also claimed to support Anglo-Saxon ideas of fair play.  Later that fall, a state convention of club members was to be held in Richmond.

The Virginia assembly's 21st-century explanation for the laws summarizes their development:
The now-discredited pseudo-science of eugenics was based on theories first propounded in England by Francis Galton, the cousin and disciple of famed biologist Charles Darwin. The goal of the "science" of eugenics was to improve the human race by eliminating what the movement's supporters considered hereditary disorders or flaws through selective breeding and social engineering. The eugenics movement proved popular in the United States, with Indiana enacting the nation's first eugenics-based sterilization law in 1907.

In the following five decades, other states followed Indiana's example by implementing the eugenic laws. Wisconsin was the first state to enact legislation that required the medical certification of persons who applied for marriage licenses.  The law that was enacted in 1913 generated attempts at similar legislation in other states.

Anti-miscegenation laws, banning interracial marriage between whites and non-whites, had existed long before the emergence of eugenics. First enacted during the Colonial era when slavery had become essentially a racial caste, such laws were in effect in Virginia and in much of the United States until the 1960s.

The first law banning all marriage between whites and Blacks was enacted in the colony of Virginia in 1691.  This example was followed by Maryland (in 1692) and several of the other Thirteen Colonies. By 1913, 30 out of the then 48 states (including all Southern states) enforced such laws.

The Pocahontas exception 

The Racial Integrity Act was subject to the Pocahontas Clause (or Pocahontas Exception), which allowed people with claims of less than 1/16 American Indian ancestry to still be considered white, despite the otherwise unyielding climate of one-drop rule politics. The exception regarding Native blood quantum was included as an amendment to the original Act in response to concerns of Virginia elites, including many of the First Families of Virginia, who had always claimed descent from Pocahontas with pride, but now worried that the new legislation would jeopardize their status. The exception stated:

It shall thereafter be unlawful for any white person in this State to marry any save a white person, or a person with no other admixture of blood than white and American Indian. For the purpose of this act, the term "white person" shall apply only to the person who has no trace whatsoever of any blood other than Caucasian; but persons who have one-sixteenth or less of the blood of the American Indian and have no other non-Caucasic blood shall be deemed to be white persons".

While definitions of "Indian", "colored" and variations of these were established and altered throughout the 18th and 19th centuries, this was the first direct case of whiteness itself being defined officially.

Enforcement 
Once these laws were passed, Plecker was in the position to enforce them. Gov. E. Lee Trinkle, a year after signing the act, asked Plecker to ease up on the Indians and not "embarrass them any more than possible."  Plecker responded, "I am unable to see how it is working any injustice upon them or humiliation for our office to take a firm stand against their intermarriage with white people, or to the preliminary steps of recognition as Indians with permission to attend white schools and to ride in white coaches."

Unsatisfied with the "Pocahontas Exception", eugenicists introduced an amendment to narrow loopholes to the Racial Integrity Act.  This was considered by the Virginia General Assembly in February 1926, but it failed to pass. If adopted, the amendment would have reclassified thousands of "white" people as "colored" by more strictly implementing the "one-drop rule" of ancestry as applied to American Indian ancestry.

Plecker reacted strongly to the Pocahontas Clause with fierce concerns of the white race being "swallowed up by the quagmire of mongrelization", particularly after marriage cases like that of the Johns and Sorrels, in which the women of these couples argued that the family members listed as "colored" had actually been Native American because of historically unclear categorizing.

Implementation and consequences: 1924–1979 
The combined effect of these two laws adversely affected the continuity of Virginia's American Indian tribes.  The Racial Integrity Act called for only two racial categories to be recorded on birth certificates, rather than the traditional six: "white" and "colored" (which now included Indian and all discernible mixed race persons). The effects were quickly seen.  In 1930, the US Census for Virginia recorded 779 Indians; by 1940, that number had been reduced to 198. In effect, Indians were being erased as a group from official records.

In addition, as Plecker admitted, he enforced the Racial Integrity Act extending far beyond his jurisdiction in the segregated society. For instance, he pressured school superintendents to exclude mixed-race (then called mulatto) children from white schools.  Plecker ordered the exhumation of dead people of "questionable ancestry" from white cemeteries to be reinterred elsewhere.

Indians reclassified as colored 
As registrar, Plecker directed the reclassification of nearly all Virginia Indians as colored on their birth and marriage certificates, because he was convinced that most Indians had African heritage and were trying to "pass" as Indian to evade segregation.  Consequently, two or three generations of Virginia Indians had their ethnic identity altered on these public documents. Fiske reported that Plecker's tampering with the vital records of the Virginia Indian tribes made it impossible for descendants of six of the eight tribes recognized by the state to gain federal recognition, because they could no longer prove their American Indian ancestry by documented historical continuity.

Involuntary sterilization 
Historians have not estimated the impact of the miscegenation laws.  There are records, however, of the number of people who were involuntarily sterilized during the years these two laws were in effect.  Of the involuntary sterilizations reported in the United States prior to 1957, Virginia was second, having sterilized a total of 6,683 persons (California was first, having sterilized 19,985 people without their consent).  Many more women than men were sterilized: 4,043 to 2,640.  Of those, 2,095 women were sterilized under the category of "Mentally Ill"; and 1,875 under the category "Mentally Deficient." The remainder were for "Other" reasons. Other states reported involuntary sterilizations of similar numbers of people as Virginia.

Leaders target minorities 
The intention to control or reduce ethnic minorities, especially Negroes, can be seen in writings by some leaders in the eugenics movement:

In an 1893 "open letter" published in the Virginia Medical Monthly, Hunter Holmes McGuire, a Richmond physician and president of the American Medical Association, asked for "some scientific explanation of the sexual perversion in the Negro of the present day." McGuire's correspondent, Chicago physician G. Frank Lydston, replied that African-American men raped white women because of "[h]ereditary influences descending from the uncivilized ancestors of our Negroes." Lydston suggested as a solution to perform surgical castration, which "prevents the criminal from perpetuating his kind.

In 1935, a decade after the passage of Virginia's eugenics laws, Plecker wrote to Walter Gross, director of Nazi Germany's Bureau of Human Betterment and Eugenics. Plecker described Virginia's racial purity laws and requested to be put on Gross' mailing list. Plecker commented upon the Third Reich's sterilization of 600 children in the Rhineland (the so-called Rhineland Bastards, who were born of German women by Black French Colonial fathers): "I hope this work is complete and not one has been missed.  I sometimes regret that we have not the authority to put some measures in practice in Virginia."

Despite lacking the statutory authority to sterilize Black, mulatto and American Indian children simply because they were "colored", a small number of Virginia eugenicists in key positions found other ways to achieve that goal. The Sterilization Act gave State institutions, including hospitals, psychiatric institutions and prisons, the statutory authority to sterilize persons deemed to be "feebleminded" — a highly subjective criterion.

Dr. Joseph DeJarnette, director of the Western State Hospital in Staunton, Virginia, was a leading advocate of eugenics. DeJarnette was unsatisfied with the pace of America's eugenics sterilization programs.  In 1938, he wrote:

Germany in six years has sterilized about 80,000 of her unfit while the United States — with approximately twice the population — has only sterilized about 27,869 in the past 20 years. ... The fact that there are 12,000,000 defectives in the U.S. should arouse our best endeavors to push this procedure to the maximum ... The Germans are beating us at our own game.

By "12 million defectives" (a tenth of the population), DeJarnette was almost certainly referring to ethnic minorities, as there have never been 12 million mental patients in the United States.

According to historian Gregory M. Dorr, the University of Virginia School of Medicine (UVA) became "an epicenter of eugenical thought" that was "closely linked with the national movement." One of UVA's leading eugenicists, Harvey Ernest Jordan, Ph.D. was promoted to dean of medicine in 1939 and served until 1949. He was in a position to shape the opinion and practice of Virginia physicians for several decades. This excerpt from a 1934 UVA student paper indicates one student's thoughts: "In Germany, Hitler has decreed that about 400,000 persons be sterilized. This is a great step in eliminating the racial deficients."

The racial effects of the program in Virginia can be seen by the disproportionately high number of Black and American Indian women who were given forced sterilizations after coming to a hospital for other reasons, such as childbirth.  Doctors sometimes sterilized the women without their knowledge or consent in the course of other surgery.

Responses to the Racial Integrity Act 
In the early twentieth century, minorities in everyday southern society feared to voice their opinions due to severe oppression. Magazines such as the Richmond Planet offered the Black community a voice and the opportunity to have their concerns heard. The Richmond Planet made a difference in society by openly expressing the opinions of minorities in society. After the passing of the Racial Integrity Act of 1924 the Richmond Planet published the article "Race Amalgamation Bill Being Passed in Va. Legislature.  Much Discussion Here on race Integrity and Mongrelization ... Bill Would Prohibit Marriage of Whites and Non-whites ..."Skull of Bones" Discusses race question.". The journalist opened the article with Racial Integrity Act and gave a brief synopsis of the act. Then followed statements from the creators of the Racial Integrity Act, John Powell and Earnest S. Cox.  Mr. Powell believed that the Racial Integrity Act was needed as "maintenance of the integrity of the white race to preserve its superior blood" and Cox believed in what he called "the great man concept" which means that if the races were to intersect that it would lower the rate of great white men in the world. He defended his position by saying that non-whites would agree with his ideology:

The sane and educated Negro does not want social equality ... They do not want intermarriage or social mingling any more than does the average American white man wants it.  They have race pride as well as we.  They want racial purity as much as we want it. There are both sides to the question and to form an unbiased opinion either way requires a thorough study of the matter on both sides.

Carrie Buck and the Supreme Court 

Racial minorities were not the only people affected by these laws. About 4,000 poor white Virginians were involuntarily sterilized by government order. When Laughlin testified before the Virginia assembly in support of the Sterilization Act in 1924, he argued that the "shiftless, ignorant, and worthless class of anti-social whites of the South," created social problems for "normal" people. He said, "The multiplication of these 'defective delinquents' could only be controlled by restricting their procreation."

Carrie Buck was the most widely known white victim of Virginia's eugenics laws.  She was born in Charlottesville to Emma Buck. After her birth, Carrie was placed with foster parents, John and Alice Dobbs. She attended public school until the sixth grade.  After that, she continued to live with the Dobbses, and did domestic work in the home.

Carrie became pregnant when she was 17, as a result of being raped by the nephew of her foster parents.  To hide the act, on January 23, 1924, Carrie's foster parents committed the girl to the Virginia State Colony for Epileptics and Feebleminded on the grounds of feeblemindedness, incorrigible behavior and promiscuity.  They did not tell the court the true cause of her pregnancy. On March 28, 1924, Buck gave birth to a daughter, whom she named Vivian. Since Carrie had been declared mentally incompetent to raise her child, her former foster parents adopted the baby.

On September 10, 1924, Dr. Albert Sidney Priddy, superintendent of the Virginia State Colony for Epileptics and Feebleminded and a eugenicist, filed a petition with his board of directors to sterilize Carrie Buck, an 18-year-old patient. He claimed she had a mental age of 9. Priddy said that Buck represented a genetic threat to society. While the litigation was making its way through the court system, Priddy died and his successor, Dr. James Hendren Bell, came on the case.

When the directors issued an order for the sterilization of Buck, her guardian appealed the case to the Circuit Court of Amherst County.  It sustained the decision of the board. The case then moved to the Supreme Court of Appeals of Virginia, where it was upheld.  It was appealed to the U.S. Supreme Court in Buck v. Bell, which upheld the order.

Justice Oliver Wendell Holmes, Jr. wrote the ruling.  He argued the interest of "public welfare" outweighed the interest of individuals in bodily integrity:

We have seen more than once that the public welfare may call upon the best citizens for their lives. It would be strange if it could not call upon those who already sap the strength of the State for these lesser sacrifices, often not felt to be such by those concerned, in order to prevent our being swamped with incompetence. It is better for all the world, if instead of waiting to execute degenerate offspring for crime, or to let them starve for their imbecility, society can prevent those who are manifestly unfit from continuing their kind. The principle that sustains compulsory vaccination is broad enough to cover cutting the Fallopian tubes.

Holmes concluded his argument with the phrase: "Three generations of imbeciles are enough."

Carrie Buck was paroled from the Virginia Colony for Epileptics and Feeble-Minded shortly after she was sterilized. Under the same statute, her mother and three-year-old daughter were also sterilized without their consent.  In 1932, her daughter Vivian Buck died of "enteric colitis."

When hospitalized for appendicitis, Doris Buck, Carrie's younger sister, was sterilized without her knowledge or consent. Never told that the operation had been performed, Doris Buck married and with her husband tried to have children.  It was not until 1980 that she was told the reason for her inability to get pregnant.

Carrie Buck went on to marry William Eagle.  They were married for 25 years until his death. Scholars and reporters who visited Buck in the aftermath of the Supreme Court case reported that she appeared to be a woman of normal intelligence.

The effect of the Supreme Court's ruling in Buck v. Bell was to legitimize eugenic sterilization laws in the United States. While many states already had sterilization laws on their books, most except for California had used them erratically and infrequently. After Buck v. Bell, dozens of states added new sterilization statutes, or updated their laws. They passed statutes that more closely followed the Virginia statute upheld by the Court.

Supreme Court, repeals and apology: 1967–2002 
In 1967 the US Supreme Court ruled in Loving v. Virginia that the portion of the Racial Integrity Act that criminalized marriages between "whites" and "nonwhites" was found to be contrary to the guarantees of equal protection of citizens under the Fourteenth Amendment to the United States Constitution. In 1975, the Virginia General Assembly repealed the remainder of the Racial Integrity Act. In 1979, it repealed the Sterilization Act. In 2001, the General Assembly overwhelmingly passed a bill (HJ607ER) to express the assembly's profound regret for its role in the eugenics movement. On May 2, 2002, Governor Mark R. Warner  issued a statement also expressing "profound regret for the commonwealth's role in the eugenics movement," specifically naming Virginia's 1924 compulsory sterilization legislation.

See also 

 Eugenics in the United States
Immorality Act
Buck v. Bell (1927)
Virginia Sterilization Act of 1924

References

External links 

 "Sterilization Act of 1924" by N. Antonios at the Embryo Project Encyclopedia
Modern Indians, Virginia's Indian People
Eugenics archive
Paul Lombardo, "Eugenic Laws Against Race Mixing"
"HOUSE JOINT RESOLUTION NO. 607, Expressing the General Assembly's regret for Virginia's experience with eugenics", Feb 14, 2001
Racial Integrity Act of 1924, Original Text
"Harry H. Laughlin", Model Eugenical Sterilization Law, Harvard University
"Kaine and Warner push for federal recognition for 6 Virginia tribes" by Joe Heim, Washington Post March 20, 2017
"How a long-dead white supremacist still threatens the future of Virginia's Indian tribes" by Joe Heim, Washington Post, July 1, 2015

1924 in American law
1924 in Virginia
Legal history of Virginia
Race legislation in the United States
Eugenics in the United States
Interracial marriage in the United States
Marriage law
Repealed United States legislation
African-American segregation in the United States
Native American segregation in the United States
African-American history of Virginia
Native American history of Virginia
History of racism in Virginia